Bamia is a Middle Eastern, Iranian, Assyrian, Armenian, Afghan, Kurdish, Sudanese, and Anatolian stew prepared using lamb, okra and tomatoes as primary ingredients. Additional ingredients used include tomato sauce, onion, garlic, cilantro (coriander), vegetable oil, cardamom, salt and pepper. The word "bamia" itself simply means "okra" and it is etymologically an Arabic word.

Vegetarian bamia is very popular during fasting seasons such as Easter in Greece and Cyprus.

Regional variations
In Turkey, bamia (natively bamya) is an Anatolian stew that has a sweet and sour flavor. It is prepared using okra, lemon juice, olive oil, sugar, salt and pepper. Turkish bamia is sometimes served as a palate cleanser between food courses at ceremonial feasts.

In Egypt, sinew (tendons) of lamb are typically used, which can endure long cooking times. Ta'aleya, an Egyptian garlic sauce, is used as an ingredient to add flavor to bamia. 

In Iran and Afghanistan, bāmieh is served as a khoresh along with rice and is a popular dish in the southern provinces.

Iraqi Jews, put semolina kubba in their bamia stew.

Terminology
In Arabic , bamyah or bamia bi-lahm ( okra with meat; ; .

See also

 Arab cuisine
 List of stews
 Turkish cuisine

Notes

References

Middle Eastern cuisine
Okra dishes
Iranian cuisine
Greek cuisine
Arab cuisine
Egyptian cuisine
Turkish stews
Armenian cuisine